David Somerville (born 9 May 1974) is a Scottish judoka. He represented the United Kingdom at the 2000 Summer Olympics in Sydney.

Judo career
Somerville is a two times champion of Great Britain, winning the British Judo Championships in 1998 and 2002.

Other achievements

References

1974 births
Living people
Scottish male judoka
Judoka at the 2000 Summer Olympics
Olympic judoka of Great Britain
Commonwealth Games medallists in judo
Commonwealth Games silver medallists for Scotland
Judoka at the 2002 Commonwealth Games
Medallists at the 2002 Commonwealth Games